The Grain and Feed Trade Association (GAFTA) is an international, London-based trade association consisting of traders, brokers, superintendents, analysts, fumigators, arbitrators and other professionals in the international grain trade.

History and development
GAFTA can trace its origins back to 1878, when the London Corn Trade Association (LCTA) was established by members of the corn trade to protect their interests. The LCTA sought to achieve this through the adoption of standard forms of contract, drawn up by the association, with any disputes arising out of these contracts being settled by arbitration rather than litigation. Disputes were referred to London and conducted under English Law.

In 1906, a group of traders broke away from the LCTA and formed a new more specialised association, the London Cattle Food Trade Association (LCFTA), for those trading in vegetable proteins used as animal feedingstuffs. In 1965, the LCFTA dropped ‘London’ from its title, reflecting growing internationalisation. In 1969, merger talks commenced between the LCTA and CFTA. The outcome of these talks was the formation of a new joint association, the Grain and Feed Trade Association in 1971.

In 2008 the International General Produce Association (IGPA) joined the Grain and Feed Trade Association.

GAFTA is headquartered in Holborn, London and currently operates four more offices, in Beijing, Geneva, Kyiv and Singapore.

Goals and main objectives 
GAFTA sets out to promote international trade and protect the interests of its members. Activities include definition and regulation of
 Quality standards, conditions of trade, guaranties
 Shipping documents and delivery conditions
 Terms of payment
Maintenance of a Register of Superintendents 
Dealing with problems and extraordinary circumstances
 Insurance
 Non-Fulfillment
 Weighting rules, sampling, analysis and insurance

GAFTA terms and conditions
It is estimated that 80% of all world trade in grains is supplied under GAFTA conditions. Rule 4.10 of GAFTA 125 requires notice of a claim to be served within one year of the incident giving rise to the claim. In the event of a dispute regarding the weight, quality or condition of a delivery, the GAFTA contract allows for appointment of GAFTA-approved surveyors representing both parties, and if there is a "major discrepancy" between the results of their surveys, then a third GAFTA-approved surveyor may be appointed as an arbitrator.

See also 
 Federation of Oils, Seeds and Fats Associations (FOSFA)
 Refined Sugar Association

Literature 
 Hugh Barty-King Food for Man and Beast: The Story of the London Corn Trade Association, the London Cattle Food Trade Association and the Grain and Feed Trade Association, 1878–1978, London: Hutchinson, 1978

References

External links
 GAFTA - official site
 GAFTA - Ukrainian site
 GAFTA - Chinese site

1878 establishments in England
Agricultural organisations based in the United Kingdom
Food industry trade groups
Grain trade
Industry trade groups based in England
Organisations based in the City of Westminster
Organizations established in 1878